Generations (Of Gospel Music) is a studio album by American recording artist Wanda Jackson. It was released in 1993 via Amethyst Records and contained ten tracks. It was the thirty eighth studio release of Jackson's career and the fifth issued on the Amethyst label. The album was a collection of gospel recordings that mixed both original and cover tunes.

Background, content and release
Wanda Jackson had some of the first female success in both the country and Rockabilly music genres. She had charting singles during the 1950s, 1960s and 1970s with songs in both fields. Jackson underwent a new personal and professional direction upon discovering Christianity in 1971. Ultimately, she began recording more gospel music and released various albums affiliated with the genre through the 1990s. Beginning in the late 1980s, Jackson began recording for an independent label based in Oklahoma titled Amethyst Records. Through the label, she released a series of gospel collections including Generations (Of Gospel Music).

Generations (Of Gospel Music) was recorded in 1993 at Studio Seven, located in Oklahoma City, Oklahoma. The sessions were produced by Gregg W. Gray. A total of ten songs were recorded for the disc. This included covers of gospel songs such as "Family Bible", "Will the Circle Be Unbroken?" and "This Train". Other tracks were original recordings, such as "You're Driftin' Too Far from Shore" and "Jesus Built the Church of Love". The album was officially released in 1993 on Amethyst Records. The album would become Jackson's thirty eighth studio release and her fifth released on Amethyst. It was issued as a cassette.

Track listing

Personnel
All credits are adapted from the liner notes of Generations (Of Gospel Music).

Musical and technical personnel
 Gregg Burges – Fiddle
 Gregg W. Gray – Keyboards, producer
 Wanda Jackson – Lead vocals
 Carolyn McCoy – Background vocals
 Dean McCoy – Steel guitar
 Billy Pay – Dobro
 Jerry Scarberry – Guitar
 Richard Sharp – Bass guitar
 Steve Short – Percussion
 Cindy St. John – Background vocals
 Robin Whitney – Background vocals
 Ric Wright – Guitar

Release history

References

1993 albums
Wanda Jackson albums